State Route 10 (SR-10) is a State Highway in the U.S. state of Utah. The highway follows a long valley in Eastern Utah between the Wasatch Plateau on the west and the San Rafael Swell on the east.

The highway serves the primary and most active coal producing region in Utah, accounting for about 2% of the coal supply of the United States Several of the routes that spur from SR-10 to cross the Wasatch Plateau have been honored for their role in energy production. SR-31 has been named The Energy Loop as part of the National Scenic Byways program.  Just off SR-10, along SR-29 is the location of the Wilberg Mine fire of 1984. According to a roadside memorial fire is the worst coal mine tragedy in Utah's history. More recently the highway was mentioned in worldwide news as part of coverage of the Crandall Canyon Mine collapse of 2007.

Though the highway is not generally used for long haul traffic, the increase in coal extraction along the SR-10 corridor has caused the Utah Department of Transportation to push for funding for improvements calling it one of the most dangerous freight corridors in Utah The northern portion of the highway is loosely paralleled by the Utah Railway that helps service the numerous coal mines along the highway corridor.

Route description

The highway begins at a junction with I-70 as a continuation of SR-72. The highway follows Castle Valley, a valley defined by the Wasatch Plateau and the San Rafael Swell. The road proceeds in a north east direction passing along several small coal mining communities. The highway also forms the boundary of Huntington State Park. The road terminates in Price at SR-55 which is an old routing of US-6/50 in downtown Price.

The entire route has been listed as part of the National Highway System.

History
The road from Price to Salina was added to the state highway system in 1910 in Carbon and Emery Counties and 1912 in Sevier County. The State Road Commission gave it the SR-10 designation in the 1920s. In 1962, the portion from Salina to near Fremont Junction was transferred to the proposed route of I-70.

Major intersections

See also

 List of state highways in Utah

References

External links

010
 010
 010
 010